

Events

Pre-1600
 192 – Dong Zhuo is assassinated by his adopted son Lü Bu.
 760 – Fourteenth recorded perihelion passage of Halley's Comet.
 853 – A Byzantine fleet sacks and destroys undefended Damietta in Egypt.
1176 – The Hashshashin (Assassins) attempt to assassinate Saladin near Aleppo.
1200 – King John of England and King Philip II of France sign the Treaty of Le Goulet.
1246 – Henry Raspe is elected anti-king of the Kingdom of Germany in opposition to Conrad IV.
1254 – Serbian King Stefan Uroš I and the Republic of Venice sign a peace treaty.
1370 – Brussels massacre: Between six and twenty Jews are murdered and the rest of the Jewish community is banished from Brussels, Belgium, for allegedly desecrating consecrated Host.
1377 – Pope Gregory XI issues five papal bulls to denounce the doctrines of English theologian John Wycliffe.
1455 – Start of the Wars of the Roses: At the First Battle of St Albans, Richard, Duke of York, defeats and captures King Henry VI of England.
1520 – The massacre at the festival of Tóxcatl takes place during the Fall of Tenochtitlan, resulting in turning the Aztecs against the Spanish.

1601–1900
1629 – Holy Roman Emperor Ferdinand II and Danish King Christian IV sign the Treaty of Lübeck ending Danish intervention in the Thirty Years' War.
1762 – Sweden and Prussia sign the Treaty of Hamburg.
  1762   – Trevi Fountain is officially completed and inaugurated in Rome.
1766 – A large earthquake causes heavy damage and loss of life in Istanbul and the Marmara region.
1804 – The Lewis and Clark Expedition officially begins as the Corps of Discovery departs from St. Charles, Missouri.
1807 – A grand jury indicts former Vice President of the United States Aaron Burr on a charge of treason.
1809 – On the second and last day of the Battle of Aspern-Essling (near Vienna, Austria), Napoleon I is repelled by an enemy army for the first time.
1816 – A mob in Littleport, Cambridgeshire, England, riots over high unemployment and rising grain costs, and the riots spread to Ely the next day.
1819 –  leaves port at Savannah, Georgia, United States, on a voyage to become the first steamship to cross the Atlantic Ocean.
1826 –  departs on its first voyage.
1840 – The penal transportation of British convicts to the New South Wales colony is abolished.
1846 – The Associated Press is formed in New York City as a non-profit news cooperative.
1848 – Slavery is abolished in Martinique.
1849 – Future U.S. President Abraham Lincoln is issued a patent for an invention to lift boats, making him the only U.S. president to ever hold a patent.
1856 – Congressman Preston Brooks of South Carolina severely beats Senator Charles Sumner of Massachusetts with a cane in the hall of the United States Senate for a speech Sumner had made regarding  Southerners and slavery.
1863 – American Civil War: Union forces begin the Siege of Port Hudson which lasts 48 days, the longest siege in U.S. military history.
1864 – American Civil War: After ten weeks, the Union Army's Red River Campaign ends in failure.
1866 – Oliver Winchester founded the Winchester Repeating Arms
1872 – Reconstruction Era: President Ulysses S. Grant signs the Amnesty Act into law, restoring full civil and political rights to all but about 500 Confederate sympathizers.

1901–present
1905 – The Sultan of the Ottoman Empire Abdul Hamid II establishes the Ullah Millet for the Aromanians of the empire. For this reason, the Aromanian National Day is sometimes celebrated on this day, although most do so on May 23 instead, which is when this event was publicly announced.
1906 – The Wright brothers are granted U.S. patent number 821,393 for their "Flying-Machine".
1915 – Lassen Peak erupts with a powerful force, the only volcano besides Mount St. Helens to erupt in the contiguous U.S. during the 20th century.
  1915   – Three trains collide in the Quintinshill rail disaster near Gretna Green, Scotland, killing 227 people and injuring 246.
1926 – Chiang Kai-shek replaces the communists in Kuomintang China.
1927 – Near Xining, China, an 8.3 magnitude earthquake causes 200,000 deaths in one of the world's most destructive earthquakes.
1939 – World War II: Germany and Italy sign the Pact of Steel.
1941 – During the Anglo-Iraqi War, British troops take Fallujah.
1942 – Mexico enters the Second World War on the side of the Allies.
1943 – Joseph Stalin disbands the Comintern.
1947 – Cold War: The Truman Doctrine goes into effect, aiding Turkey and Greece.
1948 – Finnish President J. K. Paasikivi releases Yrjö Leino from his duties as interior minister in 1948 after the Finnish parliament adopted a motion of censure of Leino with connection to his illegal handing over of nineteen people to the Soviet Union in 1945.
1957 – South Africa's government approves of racial separation in universities.
1958 – The 1958 riots in Ceylon become a watershed in the race relations of various ethnic communities of Sri Lanka. The total deaths are estimated at 300, mostly Tamils.
1960 – The Great Chilean earthquake, measuring 9.5 on the moment magnitude scale, hits southern Chile, becoming the most powerful earthquake ever recorded.
1962 – Continental Airlines Flight 11 crashes in Unionville, Missouri after bombs explode on board, killing 45.
1963 – Greek left-wing politician Grigoris Lambrakis is shot in an assassination attempt and dies five days later.
1964 – U.S. President Lyndon B. Johnson launches his Great Society program.
1967 – Egypt closes the Straits of Tiran to Israeli shipping.
  1967   – L'Innovation department store in Brussels, Belgium, burns down, resulting in 323 dead or missing and 150 injured, the most devastating fire in Belgian history.
1968 – The nuclear-powered submarine  sinks with 99 men aboard, 400 miles southwest of the Azores.
1969 – Apollo 10's lunar module flies within  of the moon's surface.
1972 – Ceylon adopts a new constitution, becoming a republic and changing its name to Sri Lanka.
  1972   – Over 400 women in Derry, Northern Ireland attack the offices of Sinn Féin following the shooting by the Irish Republican Army of a young British soldier on leave.
1987 – Hashimpura massacre occurs in Meerut, India.
  1987   – First ever Rugby World Cup kicks off with New Zealand playing Italy at Eden Park in Auckland, New Zealand.
1990 – North and South Yemen are unified to create the Republic of Yemen.
1992 – Bosnia and Herzegovina, Croatia and Slovenia join the United Nations.
1994 – A worldwide trade embargo against Haiti goes into effect to punish its military rulers for not reinstating the country's ousted elected leader, Jean-Bertrand Aristide.
1996 – The Burmese military regime jails 71 supporters of Aung San Suu Kyi in a bid to block a pro-democracy meeting.
1998 – A U.S. federal judge rules that U.S. Secret Service agents can be compelled to testify before a grand jury concerning the Lewinsky scandal involving President Bill Clinton.
2000 – In Sri Lanka, over 150 Tamil rebels are killed over two days of fighting for control in Jaffna. 
2002 – Civil rights movement: A jury in Birmingham, Alabama, convicts former Ku Klux Klan member Bobby Frank Cherry of the 1963 murder of four girls in the 16th Street Baptist Church bombing.
2010 – Air India Express Flight 812, a Boeing 737 crashes over a cliff upon landing at Mangalore, India, killing 158 of 166 people on board, becoming the deadliest crash involving a Boeing 737 until the crash of Lion Air Flight 610.
  2010   – Inter Milan beat Bayern Munich 2–0 in the UEFA Champions League final in Madrid, Spain to become the first, and so far only, Italian team to win the historic treble (Serie A, Coppa Italia, Champions League). 
2011 – An EF5 tornado strikes Joplin, Missouri, killing 158 people and wreaking $2.8 billion in damages, the costliest and seventh-deadliest single tornado in U.S. history.
2012 – Tokyo Skytree opens to the public. It is the tallest tower in the world (634 m), and the second tallest man-made structure on Earth after Burj Khalifa (829.8 m).
  2012   – SpaceX COTS Demo Flight 2 launches a Dragon capsule on a Falcon 9 rocket in the first commercial flight to the International Space Station.
2014 – General Prayut Chan-o-cha becomes interim leader of Thailand in a military coup d'état, following six months of political turmoil.
  2014   – An explosion occurs in Ürümqi, capital of China's far-western Xinjiang region, resulting in at least 43 deaths and 91 injuries.
2015 – The Republic of Ireland becomes the first nation in the world to legalize gay marriage in a public referendum.
2017 – Twenty-two people are killed at an Ariana Grande concert in the 2017 Manchester Arena bombing.
  2017   – United States President Donald Trump visits the Church of the Holy Sepulchre in Jerusalem and becomes the first sitting U.S. president to visit the Western Wall.
2020 – Pakistan International Airlines Flight 8303 crashes in Model Colony near Jinnah International Airport in Karachi, Pakistan, killing 98 people.
2021 – Severe weather kills 21 runners in the 100 km (60-mile) ultramarathon in the Yellow River Stone Forest, Gansu province of China.

Births

Pre-1600
 626 – Itzam K'an Ahk I, Mayan king (d. 686)
1009 – Su Xun, Chinese writer (d. 1066)
1408 – Annamacharya, Hindu saint (d. 1503)
1539 – Edward Seymour, 1st Earl of Hertford (d. 1621)

1601–1900
1622 – Louis de Buade de Frontenac, French soldier and governor (d. 1698)
1644 – Gabriël Grupello, Flemish Baroque sculptor (d. 1730)
1650 – Richard Brakenburgh, Dutch Golden Age painter (d. 1702)
1665 – Magnus Stenbock, Swedish field marshal and Royal Councillor (d. 1717)
1694 – Daniel Gran, Austrian painter (d. 1757)
1715 – François-Joachim de Pierre de Bernis, French cardinal and diplomat (d. 1794)
1733 – Hubert Robert, French painter (d. 1808)
1752 – Louis Legendre, French butcher and politician (d. 1797)
1762 – Henry Bathurst, 3rd Earl Bathurst, English politician (d. 1834)
1770 – Princess Elizabeth of the United Kingdom (d. 1840)
1772 – Ram Mohan Roy, Indian philosopher and reformer (d. 1833)
1779 – Johann Nepomuk Schödlberger, Austrian painter (d. 1853)
1782 – Hirose Tansō, Japanese neo-Confucian scholar, teacher, writer (d. 1856)
1783 – William Sturgeon, English physicist and inventor, invented the electromagnet and electric motor (d. 1850)
1808 – Gérard de Nerval, French poet and translator (d. 1855)
1811 – Giulia Grisi, Italian soprano (d. 1869)
  1811   – Henry Pelham-Clinton, 5th Duke of Newcastle, English politician (d. 1864)
1813 – Richard Wagner, German composer (d. 1883)
1814 – Amalia Lindegren, Swedish painter (d. 1891)
1820 – Worthington Whittredge, American painter (d. 1910)
1828 – Albrecht von Graefe, German ophthalmologist and academic (d. 1870)
1831 – Henry Vandyke Carter, English anatomist and surgeon (d. 1897)
1833 – Félix Bracquemond, French painter and etcher (d. 1914)
  1833   – Manuel Ruiz Zorrilla, Spanish politician, Prime Minister of Spain (d. 1895)
1841 – Catulle Mendès, French poet, author, and playwright (d. 1909)
1844 – Mary Cassatt, American painter and educator (d. 1926)
1846 – Rita Cetina Gutiérrez, Mexican poet, educator, and activist (d. 1908)
1848 – Fritz von Uhde, German painter and educator (d. 1911)
1849 – Aston Webb, English architect and academic (d. 1930)
1858 – Belmiro de Almeida, Brazilian painter, illustrator, sculptor (d. 1935)
1859 – Arthur Conan Doyle, British writer (d. 1930)
  1859   – Tsubouchi Shōyō, Japanese author, playwright, and educator (d. 1935)
1864 – Willy Stöwer, German author and illustrator (d. 1931)
1868 – Augusto Pestana, Brazilian engineer and politician (d. 1934)
1874 – Daniel François Malan, South African clergyman and politician, 5th Prime Minister of South Africa (d. 1959)
1876 – Julius Klinger, Austrian painter and illustrator (d. 1942)
1879 – Warwick Armstrong, Australian cricketer and journalist (d. 1947)
  1879   – Jean Cras, French admiral and composer (d. 1932)
  1879   – Symon Petliura, Ukrainian statesman and independence leader (d. 1926)
1880 – Francis de Miomandre, French author and translator (d. 1959)
1884 – Wilhelmina Hay Abbott, Scottish suffragist and feminist (d. 1957)
1885 – Giacomo Matteotti, Italian lawyer and politician (d. 1924)
  1885   – Soemu Toyoda, Japanese admiral (d. 1957)
1887 – A. W. Sandberg, Danish film director and screenwriter (d. 1938)
1891 – Johannes R. Becher, German politician, novelist, and poet (d. 1958)
1894 – Friedrich Pollock, German sociologist and philosopher (d. 1970)
1897 – Robert Neumann, German and English-speaking author (d. 1975)
1900 – Juan Arvizu, Mexican lyric opera tenor and bolero vocalist (d.1985)

1901–present
1901 – Maurice J. Tobin, American politician, 6th United States Secretary of Labor (d. 1953)
1902 – Jack Lambert, English footballer and manager (d. 1940) 
  1902   – Al Simmons, American baseball player and coach (d. 1956)
1904 – Uno Lamm, Swedish electrical engineer and inventor (d. 1989)
1905 – Bodo von Borries, German physicist and academic, co-invented the electron microscope (d. 1956)
  1905   – Tom Driberg, British politician (d. 1976)
1907 – Hergé, Belgian author and illustrator (d. 1983)
  1907   – Laurence Olivier, English actor, director, and producer (d. 1989)
1908 – Horton Smith, American golfer and captain (d. 1963)
1909 – Bob Dyer, American-Australian radio and television host (d. 1984)
  1909   – Margaret Mee, English illustrator and educator (d. 1988)
1912 – Herbert C. Brown, English-American chemist and academic, Nobel Prize laureate (d. 2004)
1913 – Rafael Gil, Spanish director and screenwriter (d. 1986)
  1913   – Dominique Rolin, Belgian author (d. 2012)
1914 – Max Kohnstamm, Dutch historian and diplomat (d. 2010)
  1914   – Sun Ra, American pianist, composer, bandleader, poet (d. 1993)
1917 – George Aratani, American businessman and philanthropist (d. 2013)
  1917   – Jean-Louis Curtis, French author (d. 1995)
1919 – Paul Vanden Boeynants, Belgian businessman and politician, 55th Prime Minister of Belgium (d. 2001)
1920 – Thomas Gold, Austrian-American astrophysicist and academic (d. 2004)
1921 – George S. Hammond, American scientist (d. 2005)
1922 – Quinn Martin, American screenwriter and producer (d. 1987)
1924 – Charles Aznavour, French-Armenian singer-songwriter and actor (d. 2018)
1925 – Jean Tinguely, Swiss painter and sculptor (d. 1991)
1927 – Michael Constantine, American actor (d. 2021)
  1927   – Peter Matthiessen, American novelist, short story writer, editor, co-founded The Paris Review (d. 2014)
  1927   – George Andrew Olah, Hungarian-American chemist and academic, Nobel Prize laureate (d. 2017)
1928 – Serge Doubrovsky, French theorist and author (d. 2017)
  1928   – John Mackenzie, Scottish director and producer (d. 2011)
  1928   – T. Boone Pickens, American businessman (d. 2019)
  1928   – Hiroshi Sano, Japanese novelist (d. 2013)
1929 – Ahmed Fouad Negm, Egyptian poet (d. 2013)
1930 – Kenny Ball, English jazz trumpet player, vocalist, and bandleader (d. 2013) 
  1930   – Marisol Escobar, French-American sculptor (d. 2016)
  1930   – Harvey Milk, American lieutenant and politician (d. 1978)
1932 – Robert Spitzer, American psychiatrist and academic (d. 2015)
1933 – Fred Anderson, Australian-South African rugby league player (d. 2012)
  1933   – Chen Jingrun, Chinese mathematician and academic (d. 1996)
1934 – Peter Nero, American pianist and conductor
1935 – Billy Rayner, Australian rugby league player (d. 2006)
1936 – George H. Heilmeier, American engineer (d. 2014)
1937 – Facundo Cabral, Argentinian singer-songwriter (d. 2011)
1938 – Richard Benjamin, American actor and director
  1938   – Susan Strasberg, American actress (d. 1999)
1939 – Paul Winfield, American actor (d. 2004)
1940 – Kieth Merrill, American filmmaker
  1940   – E. A. S. Prasanna, Indian cricketer
  1940   – Michael Sarrazin, Canadian actor (d. 2011)
  1940   – Bernard Shaw, American journalist (d. 2022)
  1940   – Mick Tingelhoff, American Pro Football Hall of Famer (d. 2021)
1941 – Menzies Campbell, Scottish sprinter and politician
1942 – Roger Brown, American basketball player (d. 1997)
  1942   – Ted Kaczynski, American academic and mathematician turned anarchist and serial murderer (Unabomber)
  1942   – Barbara Parkins, Canadian actress
  1942   – Richard Oakes, Native American civil rights activist (d. 1972)
1943 – Betty Williams, Northern Irish peace activist, Nobel Prize laureate (d. 2020)
  1943   – Tommy John, American baseball player
1944 – John Flanagan, Australian fantasy author
1945 – Bob Katter, Australian politician
1946 – George Best, Northern Irish footballer and manager (d. 2005)
  1946   – Michael Green, English physicist and academic
  1946   – Howard Kendall, English footballer and manager (d. 2015)
  1946   – Andrei Marga, Romanian philosopher, political scientist, politician
  1946   – Lyudmila Zhuravleva, Russian-Ukrainian astronomer
1948 – Tomás Sánchez, Cuban painter and engraver
  1948   – Nedumudi Venu, Indian actor and screenwriter (d. 2021)
1949 – Cheryl Campbell, English actress
  1949   – Valentin Inzko, Austrian diplomat
1950 – Bernie Taupin, English singer-songwriter and poet
1953 – François Bon, French writer
  1953   – Cha Bum-kun, South Korean footballer and manager
  1953   – Paul Mariner, English footballer, coach, and manager (d. 2021)
1954 – Barbara May Cameron, Native American human rights activist (d. 2002)
  1954   – Shuji Nakamura, Japanese-American physicist and engineer, Nobel Prize laureate
1955 – Iva Davies, Australian singer-songwriter and guitarist
1956 – Lucie Brock-Broido, American poet (d. 2018)
1957 – Lisa Murkowski, American lawyer and politician
1959 – David Blatt, Israeli-American basketball player and coach
  1959   – Olin Browne, American golfer
  1959   – Morrissey, English singer-songwriter and performer 
  1959   – Kwak Jae-yong, South Korean director and screenwriter
  1959   – Mehbooba Mufti, Indian politician
1960 – Hideaki Anno, Japanese animator, director, and screenwriter
1962 – Andrew Magee, French-American golfer
  1962   – Brian Pillman, American football player and wrestler (d. 1997)
1963 – Claude Closky, French contemporary artist
1965 – Jay Carney, American journalist, 29th White House Press Secretary
1966 – Johnny Gill, American singer-songwriter and producer
  1966   – Wang Xiaoshuai, Chinese director and screenwriter
1968 – Graham Linehan, Irish-born British activist
1969 – Cathy McMorris Rodgers, American lawyer and politician
1970 – Naomi Campbell, English model
  1970   – Brody Stevens, American comedian and actor (d. 2019)
1972 – Max Brooks, American author and screenwriter
1973 – Nikolaj Lie Kaas, Danish actor
1974 – Garba Lawal, Nigerian footballer
  1974   – Henrietta Ónodi, Hungarian Olympic gymnast
  1974   – Arseniy Yatsenyuk, Ukrainian politician
1975 – Salva Ballesta, Spanish footballer and manager
1976 – Christian Vande Velde, American cyclist	
1977 – Pat Smullen, Irish jockey (d. 2020)
1978 – Ginnifer Goodwin, American actress
  1978   – Katie Price, English television personality and glamour model
1979 – Nazanin Boniadi, Iranian-American actress
  1979   – Tihomir Dovramadjiev, Bulgarian Chess boxer
  1979   – Maggie Q, American actress
1980 – Tarin Bradford, Australian rugby league player
  1980   – Sharice Davids, American politician
  1980   – Lucy Gordon, British actress and model (d. 2009)
1981 – Daniel Bryan, American wrestler
  1981   – Bassel Khartabil, Syrian computer programmer and engineer (d. 2015)
  1981   – Jürgen Melzer, Austrian tennis player
  1981   – Mark O'Meley, Australian rugby league player
1982 – Erin McNaught, Australian model and actress
  1982   – Apolo Ohno, American speed skater
  1982   – Hong Yong-jo, North Korean footballer
1983 – Natasha Kai, American soccer player and Olympic medalist
1984 – Clara Amfo, English television and radio presenter
  1984   – Karoline Herfurth, German actress
  1984   – Didier Ya Konan, Ivorian footballer
  1984   – Dustin Moskovitz, American entrepreneur, co-founder of Facebook
1985 – Tranquillo Barnetta, Swiss footballer
  1985   – Tao Okamoto, Japanese model and actress
1986 – Julian Edelman, American football player 
  1986   – Matt Jarvis, English footballer
  1986   – Tatiana Volosozhar, Russian figure skater
1987 – Novak Djokovic, Serbian tennis player
  1987   – Arturo Vidal, Chilean footballer
1988 – Heida Reed, Icelandic-British actress
1989 – Corey Dickerson, American baseball player
1990 – Wyatt Roy, Australian politician
1991 – Joel Obi, Nigerian footballer
  1991   – Suho, South Korean singer and actor
1992 – Anna Baryshnikov, American actress
1994 – Florian Luger, Austrian male model
  1994   – Athena Manoukian, Greek-Armenian singer and songwriter
1998 – Samile Bermannelli, Brazilian fashion model
1999 – Femke Huijzer, Dutch model
  1999   – Hōshōryū Tomokatsu, Mongolian sumo wrestler
2001 – Emma Chamberlain, American internet personality
2004 – Peyton Elizabeth Lee, American actress

Deaths

Pre-1600
 192 – Dong Zhuo, Chinese warlord and politician (b. 138)
 337 – Constantine the Great, Roman emperor (b. 272)
 748 – Empress Genshō of Japan (b. 683)
1068 – Emperor Go-Reizei of Japan (b. 1025)
1310 – Saint Humility, founder of the Vallumbrosan religious order of nuns (b. c.1226)
1409 – Blanche of England, sister of King Henry V (b. 1392)
1455 – Edmund Beaufort, 2nd Duke of Somerset, English commander (b. 1406)
  1455   – Thomas Clifford, 8th Baron de Clifford, Lancastrian commander (b. 1414)
  1455   – Henry Percy, 2nd Earl of Northumberland, English commander (b. 1393)
1457 – Rita of Cascia, Italian nun and saint (b. 1381)
1490 – Edmund Grey, 1st Earl of Kent, English administrator, nobleman and magnate (b. 1416)
1538 – John Forest, English friar and martyr (b. 1471)
1540 – Francesco Guicciardini, Italian historian and politician (b. 1483)
1545 – Sher Shah Suri, Indian ruler (b. 1486)
1553 – Giovanni Bernardi, Italian sculptor and engraver (b. 1495)

1601–1900
1602 – Renata of Lorraine (b. 1544)
1609 – Pieter Willemsz. Verhoeff, Dutch captain (b. 1573)
1666 – Gaspar Schott, German physicist and mathematician (b. 1608)
1667 – Pope Alexander VII (b. 1599)
1745 – François-Marie, 1st duc de Broglie, French general (b. 1671)
1760 – Baal Shem Tov, Polish rabbi and author (b. 1700)
1772 – Durastante Natalucci, Italian historian and academic (b. 1687)
1795 – Ewald Friedrich von Hertzberg, Prussian politician, Foreign Minister of Prussia (b. 1725)
1802 – Martha Washington, First, First Lady of the United States (b. 1731)
1851 – Mordecai Manuel Noah, American journalist and diplomat (b. 1755)
1859 – Ferdinand II of the Two Sicilies (b. 1810)
1861 – Thornsbury Bailey Brown, American soldier  (b. 1829)
1868 – Julius Plücker, German mathematician and physicist (b. 1801)
1885 – Victor Hugo, French novelist, poet, and playwright (b. 1802)

1901–present
1901 – Gaetano Bresci, Italian-American anarchist, assassin of Umberto I of Italy (b. 1869)
1910 – Jules Renard, French author and playwright (b. 1864)
1932 – Augusta, Lady Gregory, Anglo-Irish activist, landlord, and playwright, co-founded the Abbey Theatre (b. 1852)
1933 – Tsengeltiin Jigjidjav, Mongolian politician, 10th Prime Minister of Mongolia (b. 1894)
1938 – William Glackens, American painter and illustrator (b. 1870)
1939 – Ernst Toller, German playwright and author (b. 1893)
  1939   – Jiří Mahen, Czech author and playwright (b. 1882)
1948 – Claude McKay, Jamaican writer and poet (b. 1889)
1954 – Chief Bender, American baseball player, coach, and manager (b. 1884)
1965 – Christopher Stone, English radio host (b. 1882)
1966 – Tom Goddard, English cricketer (b. 1900)
1967 – Langston Hughes, American poet, social activist, novelist, and playwright (b. 1902)
  1967   – Charlotte Serber, American Librarian of the Manhattan Project's Los Alamos site (b. 1911)
1972 – Cecil Day-Lewis, Anglo-Irish poet and author (b. 1904)
  1972   – Margaret Rutherford, English actress (b. 1892)
1974 – Irmgard Flügge-Lotz, German-American mathematician and aerospace engineer (b. 1903)
1975 – Lefty Grove, American baseball player (b. 1900)
1982 – Cevdet Sunay, Turkish general and politician, 5th President of Turkey (b. 1899)
1983 – Albert Claude, Belgian biologist and academic, Nobel Prize laureate (b. 1899)
  1983   – Erna Scheffler, German lawyer and justice of the Federal Constitutional Court (b. 1893)
1984 – Karl-August Fagerholm, Finnish politician, valtioneuvos, the Speaker of the Parliament and the Prime Minister of Finland (b. 1901)
1985 – Wolfgang Reitherman, German-American animator, director, and producer (b. 1909)
1988 – Giorgio Almirante, Italian journalist and politician (b. 1914)
1989 – Steven De Groote, South African pianist and educator (b. 1953)
1990 – Rocky Graziano, American boxer (b. 1922)
1991 – Lino Brocka, Filipino director and screenwriter (b. 1939)
  1991   – Shripad Amrit Dange, Indian lawyer and politician (b. 1899)
  1991   – Stan Mortensen, English footballer and manager (b. 1921)
1992 – Zellig Harris, American linguist and academic (b. 1909)
1993 – Mieczysław Horszowski, Polish-American pianist and composer (b. 1892)
1997 – Alziro Bergonzo, Italian architect and painter (b. 1906)
  1997   – Alfred Hershey, American biochemist and geneticist, Nobel Prize laureate (b. 1908)
1998 – John Derek, American actor, director, and photographer (b. 1926)
  1998   – José Enrique Moyal, Israeli physicist and engineer (b. 1910)
2000 – Davie Fulton, Canadian lawyer, judge, and politician (b. 1916)
2004 – Richard Biggs, American actor (b. 1960)
 2004    – Mikhail Voronin, Russian gymnast (b. 1945)
2005 – Charilaos Florakis, Greek politician (b. 1914)
  2005   – Thurl Ravenscroft, American voice actor and singer (b. 1914)
2006 – Lee Jong-wook, South Korean physician and diplomat (b. 1945)
2007 – Pemba Doma Sherpa, Nepalese mountaineer (b. 1970)
2008 – Robert Asprin, American soldier and author (b. 1946)
2010 – Martin Gardner, American mathematician, cryptographer, and author (b. 1914)
2011 – Joseph Brooks, American director, producer, screenwriter, and composer (b. 1938)
2012 – Muzafar Bhutto, Pakistani politician (b. 1970)
  2012   – Wesley A. Brown, American lieutenant and engineer (b. 1927)
2013 – Sigurd Ottovich Schmidt, Russian historian and ethnographer (b. 1922)
2015 – Marques Haynes, American basketball player and coach (b. 1926)
  2015   – Vladimir Katriuk, Ukrainian-Canadian SS officer (b. 1921)
2016 – Velimir "Bata" Živojinović, Serbian actor and politician (b. 1933)
2017 – Nicky Hayden, American motorcycle racer (b. 1981)
2019 – Judith Kerr, German-born British writer and illustrator (b. 1923)
2020 – Denise Cronenberg, Canadian costume designer (b. 1938)
2022 – Dervla Murphy, Irish touring cyclist and author (b. 1931)

Holidays and observances
Abolition Day (Martinique)
Aromanian National Day (marginal, celebration on May 23 is more common)
Christian feast day:
Castus and Emilius
Fulk
Humilita
Michael Hồ Đình Hy (one of Vietnamese Martyrs) 
Quiteria
Rita of Cascia
Romanus of Subiaco
May 22 (Eastern Orthodox liturgics)
Harvey Milk Day (California)
International Day for Biological Diversity (International)
United States National Maritime Day
National Sovereignty Day (Haiti)
Republic Day (Sri Lanka)
Translation of the Relics of Saint Nicholas from Myra to Bari (Ukraine)
Unity Day (Yemen), celebrates the unification of North and South Yemen into the Republic of Yemen in 1990.
World Goth Day

References

External links

 BBC: On This Day
 
 Historical Events on May 22

Days of the year
May